European route E 611 is a European B class road in France, connecting the cities Lyon and Pont-d'Ain.

Route 
 
 E15, E70, E711 Lyon
 Pont-d'Ain

External links 
 UN Economic Commission for Europe: Overall Map of E-road Network (2007)
 International E-road network

Roads in France